, also called the Tsushima domain, was a domain of Japan in the Edo period.  It is associated with Tsushima Province on Tsushima Island in modern-day Nagasaki Prefecture.
 
In the han system, Tsushima was a political and economic abstraction based on periodic cadastral surveys and projected agricultural yields.  In other words, the domain was defined in terms of kokudaka, not land area. This was different from the feudalism of the West.

History

The Sō clan was one of few daimyō clans during the Edo period which continued to control the same fiefs it controlled previously. Although it fought against Tokugawa Ieyasu at the battle of Sekigahara, the Sō clan was allowed by the shogunate to continue to rule Tsushima and entrusted it to diplomatic negotiations and trade with Joseon Korea. Its services included receptions of Korean missions to Japan. The Fuchū domain sold imports and bought exports in Osaka and Kyoto. It negotiated trade and diplomacy with the Nagasaki Commissioner in Nagasaki. It had an office (waegwan) in Busan where daily trade and diplomatic service were conducted.

The Fuchū domain was given the status of a 100,000 koku-class han although its real production was below 30,000 koku, on account of its important diplomatic status, and economic wealth as a result of trade with Korea. In the late 17th century, it prospered in Korean trade and with silver mines, but from the 18th century, it suffered from trade depression and depletion of silver ores. Its economic reforms and the shogunate's constant aid did not improve its finances. Increasing threats of Western imperial powers weighed heavily on the Fuchū domain. In 1861, a Russian naval ship occupied a port of Tsushima. What was worse for Tsushima was a growing internal conflict between pro- and anti-shogunate retainers. In 1862, it concluded an alliance with the Chōshū Domain, which was one of the prominent leaders of the Sonnō-jōi movement. But the anti-shogunate faction was purged in 1864. The loss of human resources prevented Tsushima from playing a significant role at the Meiji Restoration.

The last daimyō of Tsushima, Sō Shigemasa (Yoshiaki) became Governor of Izuhara Prefecture in 1869 and after the Abolition of the han system was given the title of Count (hakushaku) in 1884. The diplomatic service with Korea was taken over by the new Ministry of Foreign Affairs.

List of daimyōs

The hereditary daimyōs were head of the Sō clan and head of the domain.

  Sō clan, 1587–1868 (Tozama; 100,000 koku)
Sō Yoshitoshi
Sō Yoshinari
Sō Yoshizane
Sō Yoshitsugu (Yoshitomo)
Sō Yoshimichi
Sō Yoshinobu
Sō Michihiro
Sō Yoshiaki
Sō Yoshishige (Yoshiari)
Sō Yoshinaga
Sō Yoshikatsu
Sō Yoshikatsu
Sō Yoshikata
Sō Yoshiaya
Sō Yoshiyori
Sō Yoshiaki (Yoshiakira), later renamed Shigemasa

Genealogy (simplified)

 I. Sō Yoshitoshi, 1st Lord of Tsushima-Fuchū (cr. 1588) (1568–1615; r. 1588–1615)
 II. Yoshinari, 2nd Lord of Tsushima-Fuchū (1604–1657; r. 1615–1657)
 III. Yoshizane, 3rd Lord of Tsushima-Fuchū (1639-1702; r. 1657–1692)
 IV. Yoshitsugu, 4th Lord of Tsushima-Fuchū (1671–1694; r. 1692–1694)
 V. Yoshimichi, 5th Lord of Tsushima-Fuchū (1684–1718; r. 1694–1718)
 VI. Yoshinobu, 6th Lord of Tsushima-Fuchū (1692–1730; r. 1718–1730)
 VIII. Yoshiaki, 8th Lord of Tsushima-Fuchū (1716–1752; r. 1732–1752)
 X. Yoshinaga, 10th Lord of Tsushima-Fuchū (1741–1778; r. 1762–1778)
 XI. Yoshikatsu I, 11th Lord of Tsushima-Fuchū (1771–1785; r. 1778–1785)
 XII. Yoshikatsu II (Isaburō), 12th Lord of Tsushima-Fuchū (1773–1813; r. 1785–1812)
 XIII. Yoshikata, 13th Lord of Tsushima-Fuchū (1800–1838; r. 1812–1838)
 XIV. Yoshiaya, 14th Lord of Tsushima-Fuchū (1818–1842; r. 1838–1842)
 XV. Yoshiyori, 15th Lord of Tsushima-Fuchū (1818–1890; r. 1842–1862; 34th family head: 1862–1890)
 XVI. Yoshiakira (Shigemasa), 16th Lord of Tsushima-Fuchū, 1st Count (1847–1902; Lord: 1862–1868; Governor: 1869–1871; 35th family head: 1890–1902; Count: 1884)
 Shigemochi, 2nd Count, 36th family head (1867–1923; 36th family head and 2nd Count: 1902–1923)
 Kuroda Kazushi, 1st Viscount (1851–1917; adopted into the Kuroda family; Viscount: 1884)
 Takeyuki, 3rd Count, 37th family head (1908–1985; 37th family head and 3rd Count: 1923–1947; 37th family head: 1947–1985)
 Tatsuhito, 38th family head (b. 1956; 38th family head: 1985–present)
 IX. Yoshishige, 9th Lord of Tsushima-Fuchū (1717–1775; r. 1752–1762)
 VII. Michihiro, 7th Lord of Tsushima-Fuchū (1696–1760; r. 1731–1732)

See also 
 List of han
 Abolition of the han system

References

Domains of Japan
Kyushu region